The 8th Aintree 200 was a motor race, run to Formula One rules, held on 27 April 1963 at Aintree Circuit, England. The race was run over 50 laps of the circuit, and was won by British driver Graham Hill in a BRM P57.

Characteristics
This race saw one of the last instances of car changing in Formula One, as it was already illegal in World Championship races. Jim Clark's Lotus 25 was left on the starting line with a flat battery and joined the race a lap down, but after 16 laps, he swapped cars with his team-mate Trevor Taylor who was in fifth place at the time. Clark moved up to finish third, while Taylor was left in seventh place. Clark set the fastest lap of the race in Taylor's car.

Jack Brabham qualified in second place but failed to start after suffering a broken piston in practice.

Results

Wolfgang Seidel entered two cars under the Autosport Team Wolfgang Seidel banner, but these were withdrawn before the event.

References
 "The Grand Prix Who's Who", Steve Small, 1995.
 "The Formula One Record Book", John Thompson, 1974.

Aintree 200
Aintree 200
Aintree 200